Maxim Polischuk (born 15 June 1984, in Zhytomyr) is a retired Ukrainian amateur track cyclist. He won the bronze medal in men's team pursuit at the 2006 UCI Track Cycling World Championships in Bordeaux, France, and later represented his nation Ukraine at the 2008 Summer Olympics.

Polishchuk qualified for the Ukrainian squad in the men's team pursuit at the 2008 Summer Olympics in Beijing based on the nation's selection process from the UCI Track World Rankings. He delivered the Ukrainian foursome of Volodymyr Dyudya, Lyubomyr Polatayko, and Vitaliy Shchedov a ninth-place time of 4:07.883 in the prelims, narrowly missing out the match round by more than a second.

Career highlights
2004
  UCI European Junior Track Cycling Championships (Team pursuit), Valencia (ESP)
2006
  UCI Track Cycling World Championships (Team pursuit), Bordeaux (FRA)
2008
 9th Olympic Games (Team pursuit), Beijing (CHN)

References

External links
NBC Olympics Profile

1984 births
Living people
Ukrainian male cyclists
Ukrainian track cyclists
Cyclists at the 2008 Summer Olympics
Olympic cyclists of Ukraine
Sportspeople from Zhytomyr
21st-century Ukrainian people